Bountiful Tabernacle is a historic Mormon tabernacle building at Main and Center Streets in Bountiful, Utah, United States.

Description
The Greek Revival building was designed by Augustus Farnham and was begun in 1857. Work was suspended that year during the time of the Utah Expedition, also known as Buchanan's Blunder. But the structure was finally completed in 1863, including its mural of Joseph Smith, commissioned by Brigham Young and painted by Daniel Waggelund.  It was dedicated by Elder Heber C. Kimball on 14–15 March 1863.

The Bountiful Tabernacle was Farnham's most significant work, and became known worldwide. In 1976 it was added to the National Register of Historic Places.

See also

 National Register of Historic Places listings in Davis County, Utah

References

External links

19th-century Latter Day Saint church buildings
Buildings and structures in Bountiful, Utah
Churches on the National Register of Historic Places in Utah
Churches completed in 1863
Tabernacles (LDS Church) in Utah
1862 establishments in Utah Territory
National Register of Historic Places in Davis County, Utah